Mary Swander (born November 5, 1950) is an American author of Irish heritage. She holds dual citizenship in Ireland and the United States. Born in Carroll, Iowa, her ancestors immigrated to the United States during their homeland's potato famine. Swander taught for a decade on the island of Inishbofin, County Galway. 

Her books include the memoirs The Desert Pilgrim and Out of this World as well as three books of poetry, Heaven-and-Earth House, Driving the Body Back, and Succession. She served as the Poet Laureate of Iowa from 2009 to 2019. 

Swander has also co-authored a musical, Dear Iowa, with composer Christopher Frank, which has been produced across the Midwest and on Iowa Public Television.

Her awards include a Whiting Award, a National Endowment for the Arts grant for the Literary Arts, the Carl Sandburg Literary Award, and the Nation-Discovery Award.  A graduate of the Iowa Writers' Workshop at the University of Iowa, she is a Distinguished Professor of English at Iowa State University.

With an endowment from the Iowa Arts Council granted in 2009, she started a poetry website for Iowans called "The Iowa Literary Community".

External links
Official homepage
Profile at The Whiting Foundation
The Iowa Literary Community

References

1950 births
Living people
Iowa State University faculty
Iowa Writers' Workshop alumni
Poets Laureate of Iowa

20th-century American poets
Iowa Women's Hall of Fame Inductees